Wrestling Dontaku 2012 was a professional wrestling pay-per-view (PPV) event promoted by New Japan Pro-Wrestling (NJPW). The event took place on May 3, 2012, in Fukuoka, Fukuoka, at the Fukuoka Kokusai Center. The event featured nine matches, three of which were contested for championships. It was the ninth event under the Wrestling Dontaku name.

Storylines
Wrestling Dontaku 2012 featured nine professional wrestling matches that involved different wrestlers from pre-existing scripted feuds and storylines. Wrestlers portrayed villains, heroes, or less distinguishable characters in the scripted events that built tension and culminated in a wrestling match or series of matches.

Event
No Remorse Corps (Davey Richards and Rocky Romero) were originally scheduled to defend the IWGP Junior Heavyweight Tag Team Championship against Jyushin Thunder Liger and Tiger Mask during the event, however, Richards was unable to make his flight to Japan due to a car accident. As a result, NJPW stripped Richards and Romero of the title and stopped working with Richards. The event featured two titles changing hands. In the first, Low Ki defeated Prince Devitt for the IWGP Junior Heavyweight Championship. This win made Low Ki only the second foreigner, after Devitt, to win the title twice. The second title change saw Takashi Iizuka and Toru Yano defeat Tencozy Police (Hiroyoshi Tenzan and Satoshi Kojima) for the IWGP Tag Team Championship. In the main event, IWGP Heavyweight Champion Kazuchika Okada successfully defended his title against the winner of the 2012 New Japan Cup, Hirooki Goto.

Results

References

External links
The official New Japan Pro-Wrestling website

2012
2012 in professional wrestling
May 2012 events in Japan